Why the Cuckoo Cries (두견새 우는 사연 - Dugyeonsae uneun sayeon) is a 1967 South Korean film directed by Lee Kyu-woong.

Synopsis
A horror melodrama about the daughter of a kisaeng who dies of a broken heart after her boyfriend's father rejects their marriage. The woman's ghost appears to haunt the boyfriend after he marries another woman.

Cast
 Kim Ji-mee
 Shin Seong-il 
 Hwang Jung-sun 
 Do Kum-bong 
 Kim Hyo-jin 
 Lee Nak-hoon 
 Han Eun-jin 
 Jeong Min 
 Joo Sun-tae 
 Gang Mi-ae
Ahn In-sook

Bibliography

External links

References 

1967 films
South Korean horror films
1960s Korean-language films
1967 horror films